The Women's scratch at the 2012 UCI Track Cycling World Championships was held on April 6. 17 athletes participated in the contest. The competition consisted of 40 laps, making a total of 10 km.

Medalists

Results
The race was held at 19:25.

References

2012 UCI Track Cycling World Championships
UCI Track Cycling World Championships – Women's scratch
UCI